The 2021 FIFA Club World Cup final was the final match of the 2021 FIFA Club World Cup, an international club football tournament hosted by United Arab Emirates. It was the 18th final of the FIFA Club World Cup, a FIFA-organised tournament between the club champions from each of the six continental confederations, as well as the host nation's league champions.

The final was contested by English club Chelsea, representing UEFA as the reigning champions of the UEFA Champions League, and Brazilian club Palmeiras, representing CONMEBOL as the reigning champions of the Copa Libertadores.

The match was played at the Mohammed bin Zayed Stadium in Abu Dhabi on 12 February 2022. The tournament was originally planned to take place in late 2021 in Japan, but was moved to February 2022 in the United Arab Emirates due to the impact of the COVID-19 pandemic.

Chelsea won the match 2–1 after extra time for their first FIFA Club World Cup title.

Teams
In the following table, the finals until 2005 were in the FIFA Club World Championship era, and since 2006 in the FIFA Club World Cup era.

Note: On 27 October 2017, FIFA officially recognised all the champions of the Intercontinental Cup as club world champions, in equal status to the FIFA Club World Cup.
IC: Intercontinental Cup (1960–2004)
FCWC: FIFA Club World Cup finals (2000, 2005–present)

Background
Chelsea reached their second FIFA Club World Cup Final in two appearances, having done so previously in 2012, which they lost to Corinthians. Chelsea were looking to win their second title of the season, after the 2021 UEFA Super Cup.

Palmeiras were competing in the FIFA Club World Cup for the second consecutive time, having finished fourth in 2020. They reached the final for the first time after defeating Al Ahly, who had previously defeated them in the third place playoff in 2020.

This was the fourth FIFA Club World Cup Final to be played between English and Brazilian clubs, after 2005, 2012 and  2019, with only the latter being won by the English club.

Route to the final

Chelsea
Chelsea qualified for the tournament as the champions of the UEFA Champions League, having defeated fellow English club Manchester City in the final. Due to their participation in the Club World Cup, two of their Premier League fixtures were rescheduled.

As European champions, Chelsea received a bye to the semi-finals, where they faced Asian champions Al Hilal from Saudi Arabia. The Blues won the match 1–0; Romelu Lukaku scored the only goal of the game in the 32nd minute.

Palmeiras
Palmeiras entered the tournament as the winners of the Copa Libertadores, defeating another Brazilian club Flamengo after extra time in the final, which took place a few days before the draw for the Club World Cup.

Palmeiras too entered the Club World Cup in the semi-finals stage, where they played African champions Al Ahly of Egypt. Palmeiras won the match 2–0 with goals from Raphael Veiga and Dudu, their first goals in the Club World Cup.

Match

Details

Notes

References

External links

 

Final
2021
Chelsea F.C. matches
Sociedade Esportiva Palmeiras matches
2021–22 in English football
2022 in Brazilian football
2021–22 in Emirati football
Sports competitions in Abu Dhabi
21st century in Abu Dhabi